Donald Charles "Jake" Mauer (born December 20, 1978) is a former Minor League Baseball player, and former NCAA Division III baseball standout. He is a coach in the Minnesota Twins system.

Playing career
Mauer was selected by the Minnesota Twins in the 23rd round (677th overall pick) of the 2001 Major League Baseball Draft, the same draft in which they selected his younger brother, Joe Mauer (who would go on to have a 15-year career with the team), with the first overall pick. In five seasons in the Twins' farm system, Mauer compiled a .256 batting average with 82 runs batted in and no home runs.

Managing career
In Mauer's two seasons at the helm, the GCL Twins went 69-42, finishing in second and first, respectively, in the Gulf Coast League's Southern division. On October 21, he was named manager of the Fort Myers Miracle following Jeff Smith's promotion to the double A New Britain Rock Cats. Following the Twins' agreement to add the Cedar Rapids Kernels as the team's Low-A affiliate in November 2012, Mauer was named the team's manager. After four seasons, he advanced to the Chattanooga Lookouts, their Southern League team for 2017.

Personal life
He ended his minor league career with a 3-4 record and 3.66 earned run average in 43 games. Their cousin is NBA referee Ken Mauer.

Jake resides in Shoreview, Minnesota with his wife, Rachel, and three children, Lauren, Jake, and Andrew.

Honors
Cretin-Derham Hall High School Raiders Minnesota State Champion ( & )
NCAA Division III 3rd team All-American
NCAA Division III 2nd team All-America
Division III College World Series All-Tournament team (2000 & 2001)
Minnesota Intercollegiate Athletic Conference (MIAC) co-Player of the Year (2001)
St. Thomas Athletic Hall of Fame
Gulf Coast League Manager of the Year

References

External links

Living people
1978 births
Baseball players from Saint Paul, Minnesota
Chattanooga Lookouts managers
Elizabethton Twins players
Fort Myers Miracle players
Grand Canyon Rafters players
Gulf Coast Twins players
New Britain Rock Cats players
Quad Cities River Bandits players
Sportspeople from Saint Paul, Minnesota